The 7th Bahraini FA Cup started on December 24, 2008.

19 clubs were drawn into 4 groups. 3 groups of 5 teams and one group of 4 teams.

Group stages

The group winners will qualify for the semi final stage.

Group 1

Final Standings

Results

Group 2

Final Standings

Results

Group 3

Final Standings:

Results

Group 4

Final standings

Results

Semi-finals

Final

  

Bahraini FA Cup seasons
Bah
FA Cup